The Open Compute Project (OCP) is an organization that shares designs of data center products and best practices among companies, including ARM, Meta, IBM, Wiwynn, Intel, Nokia, Google, Microsoft, Seagate Technology, Dell, Rackspace, Hewlett Packard Enterprise, NVIDIA, Cisco, Goldman Sachs, Fidelity, Lenovo and Alibaba Group.

Project structure

The Open Compute Project Foundation is a 501(c)(6) non-profit incorporated in the state of Delaware. Rocky Bullock serves as the Foundation's CEO and has a seat on the board of directors. As of July 2020, there are 7 members who serve on the board of directors which is made up of one individual member and six organizational members.  Mark Roenigk (Facebook) is the Foundation's president and chairman.  Andy Bechtolsheim is the individual member.  In addition to Mark Roenigk who represents Facebook, other organizations on the Open Compute board of directors include Intel (Rebecca Weekly), Microsoft (Kushagra Vaid), Google (Partha Ranganathan), and Rackspace (Jim Hawkins).

A current list of members can be found on the opencompute.org website.

History 
The Open Compute Project began in Facebook as an internal project in 2009 called "Project Freedom". The hardware designs and engineering team were led by Amir Michael (Manager, Hardware Design) and sponsored by Jonathan Heiliger (VP, Technical Operations) and Frank Frankovsky (Director, Hardware Design and Infrastructure). The three would later open source the designs of Project Freedom and co-found the Open Compute Project. The project was announced at a press event at Facebook's headquarters in Palo Alto on April 7th 2011.

OCP projects 
The Open Compute Project Foundation maintains a number of OCP projects, such as:

Server designs 
Two years after Open Compute Project had started, with regards to a more modular server design, it was admitted that "the new design is still a long way from live data centers". However, some aspects published were used in Facebook's Prineville data center to improve energy efficiency, as measured by the power usage effectiveness index defined by The Green Grid.

Efforts to advance server compute node designs included one for Intel processors and one for AMD processors. In 2013, Calxeda contributed a design with ARM architecture processors. Since then, several generations of OCP server designs have been deployed: Wildcat (Intel), Spitfire (AMD), Windmill (Intel E5-2600), Watermark (AMD), Winterfell (Intel E5-2600 v2) and Leopard (Intel E5-2600 v3)

Data storage 
Open Vault storage building blocks offer high disk densities, with 30 drives in a 2U Open Rack chassis designed for easy disk drive replacement. The 3.5 inch disks are stored in two drawers, five across and three deep in each drawer, with connections via serial attached SCSI. This storage is also called Knox, and there is also a cold storage variant where idle disks power down to reduce energy consumption. Another design concept was contributed by Hyve Solutions, a division of Synnex in 2012. At the OCP Summit 2016 Facebook together with Taiwanese ODM Wistron's spin-off Wiwynn introduced Lightning, a flexible NVMe JBOF (just a bunch of flash), based on the existing Open Vault (Knox) design.

Rack designs 
The designs for a mechanical mounting system have been published, so that open racks have the same outside width (600 mm) and depth as standard 19-inch racks, but are designed to mount wider chassis with a 537 mm width (21 inches). This allows more equipment to fit in the same volume and improves air flow. Compute chassis sizes are defined in multiples of an OpenU, which is 48 mm, slightly taller than the typical 44mm rack unit.

Energy efficient data centers 
The OCP has published data center designs for energy efficiency.  These include power distribution at 277 VAC, which eliminates one transformer stage in typical data centers, a single voltage (12.5 VDC) power supply designed to work with 277 VAC input, and 48 VDC battery backup.

Open networking switches 

On May 8, 2013, an effort to define an open network switch was announced. The plan was to allow Facebook to load its own operating system software onto the switch. Press reports predicted that more expensive and higher-performance switches would continue to be popular, while less expensive products treated more like a commodity (using the buzzword "top-of-rack") might adopt the proposal.

The first attempt at an open networking switch by Facebook was designed together with Taiwanese ODM Accton using Broadcom Trident II chip and is called Wedge, the Linux OS that it runs is called FBOSS. Later switch contributions include "6-pack" and Wedge-100, based on Broadcom Tomahawk chips. Similar switch hardware designs have been contributed by: Edgecore Networks Corporation (Accton spin-off), Mellanox Technologies, Interface Masters Technologies, Agema Systems. Capable of running Open Network Install Environment (ONIE)-compatible network operating systems such as Cumulus Linux, Switch Light OS by Big Switch Networks, or PICOS by Pica8. A similar project for a custom switch for the Google platform had been rumored, and evolved to use the OpenFlow protocol.

Servers 
Sub-project for Mezzanine (NIC) OCP NIC 3.0 specification 1v00 was released in late 2019 establishing 3 form factors: SFF, TSFF, and LFF .

Litigation
In March, 2015, BladeRoom Group Limited and Bripco (UK) Limited sued Facebook, Emerson Electric Co. and others alleging that Facebook has disclosed BladeRoom and Bripco's trade secrets for prefabricated data centers in the Open Compute Project. Facebook petitioned for the lawsuit to be dismissed, but this was rejected in 2017. A confidential mid-trial settlement was agreed in April 2018.

See also 
 Novena (computing platform)
 OpenBMC
 Open-source computing hardware
 OpenPOWER Foundation
 Telecom Infra Project – Facebook sister project focusing on Optical broadband networks and open cellular networks

References

External links 
 
 Data Centers
 Prineville Data Center
 Forest City Data Center
 Altoona Data Center
 Luleå Data Center (Sweden)
 Fort Worth Data Center
 Clonee Data Center (Ireland)
 Videos
 , Hot Chips 23, 2011 2.5 Hour Tutorial
 , Facebook V1 Open Compute Server
 
 , Open Compute starts at 5:40
 Case Studies
 Game publisher builds a cost-efficient, scalable data center and reduces operational complexities with OCP.

Open-source hardware
Facebook
2011 software
Data centers
Data management
Servers (computing)
Distributed data storage
Distributed data storage systems
Applications of distributed computing
Cloud storage
Computer networking
Science and technology in the San Francisco Bay Area